Antonio Lozada Jr. (born May 15, 1992) is a Mexican professional boxer. He is considered one of the best prospects to come from Mexico.

Personal life
Nicknamed Cañitas after his father Cañas which is Spanish for sugar cane. His father, Antonio Lozada Sr., is a boxing agent who mans the career of Lozada Jr. and also of newly crowned three time world champion Humberto Soto as well as practically every top prospect in the Mexican town of Tijuana which includes Marvin Quintero.

Professional career
Lozada turned professional at only sixteen years of age. His eighteenth victory came in Cozumel, going the distance with Tomas Sierra. In 2009 he was not very busy due to a nasal operation but in October of that year he fought Salvador Carreon winning by third-round TKO.

He headlined his first nationally televised  card in April 2010 on Televisa, where he won the WBC FECARBOX light welterweight title by defeating the veteran Colombian Henry Aurad via second-round TKO.

On June 25, 2011 Lozada faced then-undefeated Roberto Ortiz for the WBC Silver light welterweight title.

On March 17, 2018, Lozada knocked out Puerto Rico prospect Felix Verdejo in 10 rounds.

Professional boxing record

|- style="margin:0.5em auto; font-size:95%;"
|align="center" colspan=8|40 Wins (34 knockouts, 6 decisions), 5 Losses, 1 Draw
|- style="margin:0.5em auto; font-size:95%;"
|align=center style="border-style: none none solid solid; background: #e3e3e3"|Res.
|align=center style="border-style: none none solid solid; background: #e3e3e3"|Record
|align=center style="border-style: none none solid solid; background: #e3e3e3"|Opponent
|align=center style="border-style: none none solid solid; background: #e3e3e3"|Type
|align=center style="border-style: none none solid solid; background: #e3e3e3"|Rd., Time
|align=center style="border-style: none none solid solid; background: #e3e3e3"|Date
|align=center style="border-style: none none solid solid; background: #e3e3e3"|Location
|align=center style="border-style: none none solid solid; background: #e3e3e3"|Notes 
|-align=center
|Loss|| 40-5-1 ||align=left|
 Javier Fortuna
| ||  || || align=left|
|align=left|
|-align=center
|Loss|| 40-4-1 ||align=left| Marco Juarez
| ||  || || align=left|
|align=left|
|-align=center
|Loss|| 40-3-1 ||align=left| Jose Pedraza 
| ||  || || align=left|
|align=left|
|-align=center
|Draw || 40-2-1 ||align=left| Hector Ambriz
| ||  || || align=left|
|align=left|
|-align=center
|Win || 40-2 ||align=left| Christian Valverde
| ||  || || align=left|
|align=left|
|-align=center
|Win || 39-2 ||align=left| Felix Verdejo
| ||  || || align=left|
|align=left|
|-align=center
|Win || 38-2 ||align=left| Miguel Garcia
| ||  || || align=left|
|align=left|
|-align=center
|Win || 37-2 ||align=left| Jesus Eduardo Soto
| ||  || || align=left|
|align=left|
|-align=center
|Win || 36-2 ||align=left| Jose Maria Valdez
| ||  || || align=left|
|align=left|
|-align=center
|Win || 35-2 ||align=left| Carlos Jacobo
| ||  || || align=left|
|align=left|
|-align=center
|Win || 34-2 ||align=left| Cristian Solano
| ||  || || align=left|
|align=left|
|-align=center
|Win || 33-2 ||align=left| Ramiro Alcaraz
| ||  || || align=left|
|align=left|
|-align=center
|Loss || 32-2 ||align=left| Ramiro Alcaraz
| ||  || || align=left|
|align=left|
|-align=center
|Win || 32-1 ||align=left| Jorge Pimentel
| ||  || || align=left|
|align=left|
|-align=center
|Win || 31-1 ||align=left| Jose Luis Payan
| ||  || || align=left|
|align=left|
|-align=center
|Win || 30-1 ||align=left| David Cavita
| ||  || || align=left|
|align=left|
|-align=center
|Win || 29-1 ||align=left| Edgar Llanes
| ||  || || align=left|
|align=left|
|-align=center
|Win || 28-1 ||align=left| Daniel Valenzuela
| ||  || || align=left|
|align=left|
|-align=center
|Win || 27-1 ||align=left| Carlos Urias
| ||  || || align=left|
|align=left|
|-align=center
|Win || 26-1 ||align=left| Daniel Valenzuela
| ||  || || align=left|
|align=left|
|-align=center
|Win || 25-1 ||align=left| Cesar Chavez
| ||  || || align=left|
|align=left|
|-align=center
|Win || 24-1 ||align=left| Joel Juarez
| ||  || || align=left|
|align=left|
|-align=center
|Loss || 23-1 ||align=left| Roberto Ortiz
| ||  || || align=left|
|align=left|
|-align=center
|Win || 23-0 ||align=left| Hugo Hernández
| ||  || || align=left|
|align=left|
|-align=center
|Win || 22-0 ||align=left| Henry Aurad
| ||  ||  || align=left|
|align=left|
|-align=center
|Win || 21-0||align=left| Jesus Valenzuela 
| ||  ||  || align=left|
|align=left|
|-align=center
|Win || 20-0 ||align=left| Salvador Carreon
| ||  ||  || align=left|
|align=left|
|-align=center
|Win || 19-0 ||align=left| Tomas Sierra
| ||  ||  || align=left|
|align=left|
|-align=center
|Win || 18-0 ||align=left| Tomas Sierra
| ||  ||  || align=left|
|align=left|
|-align=center
|Win || 17-0 || align=left| Ernesto Aboyte
| ||  ||  || align=left|
|align=left|
|-align=center
|Win || 16-0 || align=left| Juan Ruiz
| ||  ||  || align=left|
|align=left|
|-align=center
|Win || 15-0 || align=left| Adolfo Arrellano
| ||  ||  || align=left|
|align=left|
|-align=center
|Win || 14-0 || align=left| Neftali Perez
| ||  ||  || align=left|
|align=left|
|-align=center
|Win || 13-0 ||align=left| Eugenio Lopez
| ||  ||  || align=left|
|align=left|
|-align=center
|Win || 12-0 ||align=left| Celso Gomez
| ||  ||  || align=left|
|align=left|
|-align=center
|Win || 11-0 ||align=left| Charly Valdez
| ||  ||  || align=left|
|align=left|
|-align=center
|Win || 10-0 ||align=left| Roberto Resendiz
| ||  ||  || align=left|
|align=left|
|-align=center
|Win || 9-0 || align=left| Carlos Urrea
| ||  ||  || align=left|
|align=left|
|-align=center
|Win || 8-0 || align=left| Javier Castro
| ||  ||  || align=left|
|align=left|
|-align=center
|Win || 7-0 || align=left| Gaby Ruiz
| ||  ||  || align=left|
|align=left|
|-align=center
|Win || 6-0 || align=left| Abraham Rotmizbel
| ||  ||  || align=left|
|align=left|
|-align=center
|Win || 5-0 ||align=left| Willy Velasco 
| ||  ||  || align=left|
|align=left|
|-align=center
|Win || 4-0 ||align=left| Levi Perez
| ||  ||  || align=left|
|align=left|
|-align=center
|Win || 3-0 ||align=left| Juan Gudino
| ||  ||  || align=left|
|align=left|
|-align=center
|Win || 2-0 ||align=left| Julio Acosta
| ||  ||  || align=left|
|align=left|
|-align=center
|Win || 1-0 || align=left| Roberto Mondragon
| ||  ||  || align=left|
|align=left|
|-align=center

References

External links

Boxers from Baja California
Sportspeople from Tijuana
Light-welterweight boxers
1992 births
Living people
Mexican male boxers